The Union of Forces for Democracy and Development–Fundamental (UFDD–F) is one of the rebel groups fighting in the war in Chad. It is led by Abdelwahid Aboud Mackaye.

References

Chadian Civil War (2005–2010)
Rebel groups in Chad